A tube well is a type of water well in which a long, -wide, stainless steel tube or pipe is bored underground. The lower end is fitted with a strainer, and a pump lifts water for irrigation.  The required depth of the well depends on the depth of the water table.

History
The tube well was invented by British hydrologist  John Norton in the 1860's and patented. Versions of his tubewells were used during the British expedition to Abyssinia in 1868 to provide ground water for the advancing force. It proved so successful for the British that they became known as "Abyssinian wells" and were widely adopted in England and elsewhere for providing reliable water supplies

Components

Temporary reservoir
A small reservoir of water is made at the outlet of the tube well. This reservoir is used for different usage of water by the local population.

Casing

The tube well casing houses the inlet, cylinder, piston valves and rising main of a "down-the-hole" type hand pump. Casing to support the external surfaces of the borehole against collapse may be needed, either temporarily or permanently, and is often made of PVC pipe, which is both cheap and inert.

Seepage down the tube well bore is prevented by the sanitary seal. Seepage from the ground above the aquifer is excluded by the lengths of plain casing. Water to be pumped is admitted through slots in the lower lengths of casing.

Water abstracted from aquifers in relatively soft ground usually contains sand or silt particles, which are liable to cause rapid wear to pump valves and cylinders (and dissatisfaction among consumers). Methods of preventing these particles from reaching the pump are of two general types, screening and sand/gravel packing.

Screening 
In the simplest devices, slots are simply cut in the casing. More elaborate compact screens are available commercially; some can be bolted on to pump inlets. Materials used include woven wire and man-made fabric; the latter can be wrapped around the pump inlet assembly.

Sand/gravel packing 
Graded sand and gravel may be placed from the top of the borehole. More compact, pre-bonded, packs of sand and/or gravel are available commercially; some of these can also form part of the pump inlet assembly. Sand and/or gravel packing is meant to eliminate particles from the water before they reach the screen which they would otherwise have passed through.

Ground water safety 
The introduction of tube wells has led to major arsenic poisoning in Bangladesh. High concentrations of arsenic occur naturally in the soil in some areas of Bangladesh.

Advantages of tube well irrigation 
 Groundwater is easily available.
 The water table is fairly close to the surface.
 Able to irrigate a much larger area.
 More reliable during periods of drought when surface water dries up.
 Suitable for small holdings.

References

Water wells